Franz Dienert (1 January 1900 – 1978) was a German footballer who participated at the 1934 FIFA World Cup. He played club football with VfB Mühlburg.

References

1900 births
1978 deaths
German footballers
Karlsruher SC players
1934 FIFA World Cup players
Association football forwards